Lee Bae-Young (born December 10, 1979) is a male South Korean weightlifter.

At the 2000 Summer Olympics he ranked 7th in the 69 kg category.

He won the silver medal in the 69 kg category at the 2003 World Weightlifting Championships, after Vladislav Lukanin was tested positive for banned substances and lost his silver medal.

He competed in the 2004 Summer Olympics, and won the silver medal in the 69 kg category.

Also at the 2005 World Weightlifting Championships he won the silver medal in the 69 kg category.

Notes and references

External links
 profile
 Athlete Biography at beijing2008

1979 births
Living people
South Korean male weightlifters
Olympic weightlifters of South Korea
Weightlifters at the 2000 Summer Olympics
Weightlifters at the 2004 Summer Olympics
Weightlifters at the 2008 Summer Olympics
Olympic silver medalists for South Korea
Olympic medalists in weightlifting
Weightlifters at the 2002 Asian Games
Medalists at the 2004 Summer Olympics
Asian Games competitors for South Korea
World Weightlifting Championships medalists
20th-century South Korean people
21st-century South Korean people